Arismendi is a Basque surname, formed from aritz (oak) + mendi (mountain), and thus meaning "mountain of oaks". The Basque people are indigenous to the area of northeast Spain and southwest France, a historical region known as the Basque Country.

History 
A branch of the family immigrated to Latin America. One of the first to do so  was probably Juan Bernardo de Arismendi, who was from Fuenterrabía, Spain. He immigrated to present-day Venezuela, and was commander of the fortress in Araya during the second half of the 17th century. Through him, the Arismendi family became one of the most prominent families in Venezuela, and many historical figures in Venezuelan history derive from the family.

People with the surname Arismendi 
 Daladier Arismendi (1975-2014), better known as Dala, was the founder of the Colombian reggae group Alerta Kamarada
 Daniel Arismendi, Venezuelan footballer
 Diego Arismendi, Uruguayan footballer
 Fernando Arismendi, Uruguayan footballer
 Helena Arizmendi (1927–2015), Argentine opera singer
 Juan Bautista Arismendi, Venezuelan patriot and general of the Venezuelan War of Independence
 Juan Bernardo Arismendi, Venezuelan real estate developer
 Luisa Cáceres de Arismendi (1799-1866), heroine of the Venezuelan War of Independence
 Marcelo Arismendi, Chilean journalist and television presenter
 Marina Arismendi, Uruguayan senator and minister of social development
 Rodney Arismendi, former Secretary-General of the Communist Party of Uruguay
 Rodolfo Loero Arismendi, Venezuelan founder of the first chemical industrial school in Caracas and of the University Institute of Industrial Technology Rodolfo Loero Arismendi
 Margot Arismendi Amengual, Venezuelan wife of architect Carlos Raúl Villanueva
 Yanina Angelini Arismendi, Uruguayan painter, gallerist and social justice activist living in the USA

See also 
 Arizmendi
 Harizmendi

References

Basque-language surnames
Surnames